Ingrid Marianne Lundquist (later Grane, 24 July 1931 – 10 April 2020) was a Swedish freestyle swimmer who won a bronze medal in the 4 × 100 m relay at the  1950 European Aquatics Championships. She competed at the 1948 and 1952 Olympics in the 100 m, 400 m and 4 × 100 m events with the best result of sixth place in the relay in 1952. She died 10 April 2020, from COVID-19.

References

1931 births
2020 deaths
Swedish female freestyle swimmers
Olympic swimmers of Sweden
Swimmers at the 1948 Summer Olympics
Swimmers at the 1952 Summer Olympics
European Aquatics Championships medalists in swimming
SK Neptun swimmers
Deaths from the COVID-19 pandemic in Sweden
People from Karlskoga Municipality
Sportspeople from Örebro County
20th-century Swedish women